William Carter Phillips (born October 1988 in Richmond, Virginia) is a professional poker player from Charlotte, North Carolina who won the 2010 World Series of Poker $1,500 No Limit Hold'em Six Handed event earning $482,774 and is the winner of the European Poker Tour Season 6 Barcelona Main Event earning €850,000 ($1,216,023). Carter is ranked #24184 on the Global Poker Index (info from July 8, 2014).

As of 2012, his total live tournament winnings exceed $2,600,000.

World Series of Poker bracelets

References

External links
 Cardplayer results

1988 births
Living people
World Series of Poker bracelet winners
American poker players
European Poker Tour winners